{{DISPLAYTITLE:C26H42N7O17P3S}}
The molecular formula C26H42N7O17P3S (molar mass: 849.64 g/mol, exact mass: 849.1571 u) may refer to:

 Methylcrotonyl-CoA
 Tiglyl-CoA